The Politics of Changde in Hunan province in the People's Republic of China is structured in a dual party-government system like all other governing institutions in mainland China.

The Mayor of Changde is the highest-ranking official in the People's Government of Changde or Changde Municipal Government. However, in the city's dual party-government governing system, the Mayor has less power than the Changde Municipal Committee Secretary of the Chinese Communist Party (CCP), colloquially termed the "CCP Party Chief of Changde" or "Communist Party Secretary of Changde".

History
On December 15, 2011, Cheng Haibo was sentenced to life imprisonment, deprived of political rights for life, and confiscated personal property, for accepting bribes.

List of mayors of Changde

List of CPC Party secretaries of Changde

References

Changde
Changde